HMS Milford was a 28-gun  sixth-rate frigate of the Royal Navy. She was built at Milford by Richard Chitty and launched in 1759. She was sold for breaking at Woolwich on 17 May 1785.

Construction

In sailing qualities Milford was broadly comparable with French frigates of equivalent size, but with a shorter and sturdier hull and greater weight in her broadside guns. She was also comparatively broad-beamed with ample space for provisions and the ship's mess, and incorporating a large magazine for powder and round shot. Taken together, these characteristics would enable Milford to remain at sea for long periods without resupply. She was also built with broad and heavy masts, which balanced the weight of her hull, improved stability in rough weather and made her capable of carrying a greater quantity of sail. The disadvantages of this comparatively heavy design were a decline in manoeuvrability and slower speed when sailing in light winds.

Her designated complement was 200, comprising two commissioned officers  a captain and a lieutenant  overseeing 40 warrant and petty officers, 91 naval ratings, 38 Marines and 29 servants and other ranks. Among these other ranks were four positions reserved for widow's men  fictitious crew members whose pay was intended to be reallocated to the families of sailors who died at sea.

Service history

Following Spain's declaration of war, joining the French against Great Britain in the Seven Years' War, Milford fell in with an aviso carrying orders from Spain to its forces in Havana. The ships met off Cape Tiburon, the westernmost point of St Domingo and after fighting all day the aviso was forced to strike. The avisos commander sank his despatches and the only document received in Havana was a copy of the Madrid Gazette containing the Spanish declaration of war.

On 6 June 1776, Milford captured the American privateer , a 14-gun, single-deck sloop, after a two-hour battle. The Americans had believed they were chasing a merchantman, but reversed course when they came close enough to recognize the British ship of war. Milford gave chase and caught up to the much smaller ship after about an hour, firing only bow chasers until she was able to come along and give a full broadside. Yankee Heros sails were shredded and almost half her crew incapacitated. Her commander, Captain James Tracy ordered the surrender when they were no longer able to either fight or flee. Four or five of Yankee Heros crew were killed and twelve or thirteen wounded, including the captain.

Milford stands out as the British vessel that engaged the first American armed vessel, .  In the Battle of Yarmouth, under the command of Captain Joseph Olney, Cabot stood out of Boston weeks before on 23 March 1777 the vessel encountered Milford. The vastly more powerful British ship chased Cabot and forced her ashore in Nova Scotia. While Cabots captain and crew escaped into the woods unharmed, the British were later able to get the brig off, and refitted her for service in the Royal Navy.

On 15 March 1779, the British warships Apollo, and Milford captured the French privateer cutter . The Royal Navy took her into service under her existing name.

The Royal Navy took both into service essentially under their existing names. Jupiter shared the prize money with Apollo, and Milford.

Notes

References

Bibliography

External links
 

Frigates of the Royal Navy
1759 ships